Regular Fries were an English electronica/rock group. Their style was surreal and infused with the space age. Although chart success eluded them they received rave reviews in the music media from NME, Rolling Stone and Loaded, who were once moved to call them "the best rock'n'roll  band in the world". On their split in March 2001, songwriter Paul Moody announced "We hate the charts and the charts hate us. We're off into the cosmos!".

History
The band was formed in 1997 in North London by graphic designer Will Beaven (keyboards), music journalist Paul Moody (synthesizer, vibes), and film-maker Andy Starke (drums). The line-up was completed by Dave Brothwell (vocals), Rich Little (vocals, percussion), Pat O'Sullivan (bass), and Stephen Griffin (guitar). Sometimes regarded part of the "skunk rock" movement, the band became known for their extravagant live shows. After touring with the Lo Fidelity Allstars, the band's debut album, Accept the Signal, was released in 1999, followed the next year by War on Plastic Plants, which included a collaboration with Kool Keith on "Coke N Smoke (Supersonic Waves)". Their third and final album while together, Blueprint for a Higher Civilization, was released in 2001, the band splitting up the same year.

Discography

Albums
Accept the Signal (June 1999) JBO
War On Plastic Plants (2000) JBO
Blueprint for a Higher Civilisation (2001) Soft City/Sony
Phone in Sick (Compilation) (2004)

Singles
"Dust It, Don't Bust It" (1997) Fierce Panda (split 7-inch with Campag Velocet)
"Dust It, Don't Bust It (full version)" 12-inch EP (1998) Rabid Badger
Free The Regular Fries EP (September 1998) JBO
Fries Entertainment EP (1998) JBO
"King Kong" (June 1999) JBO
"Dust It" (1999) JBO
Smokin' Cigars With The Pharaohs EP (2000) JBO
"Supersonicwaves" (2000) JBO
"Eclipse" (2001) JBO (withdrawn)
Transmissions From the War Office vol. 1 EP (2001) Soft City
"Afrika" (2001) Soft City

References

English rock music groups
English electronic music groups
Musical groups established in 1997
Musical groups established in 2001
1993 establishments in England
2001 disestablishments in England
Musical groups from London